Zdeněk Folprecht (Turnov 26 January 1900 -  29 October 1961 Prague) was a Czech composer and conductor.

References

Czech composers
Czech male composers
Czech conductors (music)
Male conductors (music)
1900 births
1961 deaths
People from Turnov
20th-century conductors (music)
Burials at Vyšehrad Cemetery
20th-century Czech male musicians